Jalari is one of the villages in Nadaun of Hamirpur, India.

Geography
Jalari is located 3.3 km from its Mandal main town Nadaun. Jalari is 22.7 km from its District Main City Hamirpur. It is 106 km from its State Main City Shimla.

Nearby villages are Bela (2.7 km), Nadaun (3.3 km), Lahar Kotlu (3.4 km), Bhumpal (3.4 km), Karaur (4 km). Nearest towns are Nadaun (3.3 km), Tira Sujanpur (15.4 km), Hamirpur (22.7 km), Bamson (23.1 km). Amlehar, Badaran, Badhera, Balduhak, Bara, Basaral are the villages along with village in the same Nadaun Mandal

Postal Pin is '177042' and other villages in Post Office (177042) are Batran, Ghaloon, Jalari, Batrahan, and Maloonda.

Education

Schools near by Jalari

KOTLA-KALLAR
GMS CHILLIAN
Bhagvati Public School,Jalari 
Govt. Senior Secondary School Jalari

Graduate Colleges near by Jalari

DAWARKA DASS MEMORIAL Sai College of Education
SHRI SAI COLLEGE OF EDUCATION
Sidharth Government Degree College Nadaun, Himachal Pradesh.

References 

Villages in Hamirpur district, Himachal Pradesh